Natallia Helakh (Nataliya Gelakh; born 30 May 1978) is a Belarusian rower who competed at the 2000, 2004 and 2008 Olympics. Rowing with Yuliya Bichyk, she won a bronze medal in the coxless pairs in 2004 and 2008, and finished in fourth place in the eights in 2000. Between 2000 and 2011, Helakh and Bichyk also won nine medals at European and world championships.

References

External links 
 
 
 

Living people
Belarusian female rowers
Olympic bronze medalists for Belarus
Olympic rowers of Belarus
Rowers at the 2000 Summer Olympics
Rowers at the 2004 Summer Olympics
Rowers at the 2008 Summer Olympics
1978 births
Olympic medalists in rowing
Medalists at the 2008 Summer Olympics
World Rowing Championships medalists for Belarus
Medalists at the 2004 Summer Olympics
European Rowing Championships medalists
Sportspeople from Brest, Belarus